The 1986 World Sambo Championships were held in Saint-Jean-de-Luz, France in November 1986. Championships were organized by FIAS.

Medal overview

External links 
Results on Sambo.net.ua

World Sambo Championships
1986 in sambo (martial art)